The 2003 FA Premier League Asia Cup was the first edition of the Premier League Asia Trophy, a four-team pre-season football tournament held every two years. Participants in the inaugural edition included hosts Malaysia and three Premier League teams: Chelsea, Newcastle United and Birmingham City. All games were held at the Bukit Jalil National Stadium in Kuala Lumpur.

The tournament began at the semi-final stage, with the winners advancing to the final and the losers playing off for third place. Chelsea became the inaugural winners of this tournament after defeating Newcastle United on penalties in the final.

Results

Semi-finals

Third place play-off

Final

Goalscorers

2 goals
 Stern John
1 goal
 Alan Shearer
 Paul Devlin
 Shola Ameobi
 Frank Lampard
 Hairuddin Omar
 Jimmy Floyd Hasselbaink
 Eiður Guðjohnsen
 Glen Johnson
 Stephen Clemence
 Bryan Hughes

External links
FA Premier League Asia Cup 2003 (RSSSF)
FA Premier League Asia Cup 2003 (Goalzz.com)

Premier League Asia Trophy
2003
Asia
2003 in Malaysian football